is a town located in Kamimashiki District, Kumamoto Prefecture, Japan.

As of November 2016, the town has an estimated population of 9,119 and a density of 550 persons per km². The total area is 16.66 km².

Kashima Town is well known for being home to AEON Mall Kumamoto.

Notable people from Kashima
Yoshiazuma Hiroshi, sumo wrestler
Shigeyoshi Matsumae, founder of Tokai University

References

External links

Kashima official website 

Towns in Kumamoto Prefecture